Carl Edgel Shaeffer (October 25, 1924 – October 25, 1974) was an American professional basketball player. He played for the Indianapolis Olympians in the National Basketball Association between 1949–50 and 1950–51 after a collegiate career at the University of Alabama. Shaeffer was Alabama's first-ever professional basketball player. He became a businessman in Indianapolis, Indiana after his short-lived NBA career.

Personal life
Shaeffer served in the United States Army during World War II and was taken prisoner of war by German forces in Belgium on January 18, 1945. Initially reported missing in action, he was later found to be a prisoner and was released at the end of the war. Following his basketball career, Shaeffer operated a tavern in Brookston, Indiana. He committed suicide by shooting himself on his 50th birthday in 1974.

Career statistics

NBA
Source

Regular season

Playoffs

References

1924 births
1974 suicides
20th-century American businesspeople
Alabama Crimson Tide men's basketball players
United States Army personnel of World War II
Basketball players from Indianapolis
Forwards (basketball)
Indianapolis Olympians players
People from Delphi, Indiana
Businesspeople from Indiana
American men's basketball players
Missing in action of World War II
American prisoners of war in World War II
World War II prisoners of war held by Germany
Suicides by firearm in Indiana
Undrafted National Basketball Association players